Memorial to the Missing may refer to any of the following monuments:

The Cambrai Memorial to the Missing (also known as the Louverval Memorial), at Louverval, France
The Thiepval Memorial (fully the Thiepval Memorial to the Missing of the Somme), near the village of Thiepval, Picardy in France
The Ploegsteert Memorial to the Missing, near Ypres, Belgium
Tyne Cot (fully the Tyne Cot Commonwealth War Graves Cemetery and Memorial to the Missing), near Passendale, Belgium
The West Coast Memorial to the Missing of World War II, near San Francisco, California, United States
The Menin Gate (fully the Menin Gate Memorial to the Missing), in Ypres, Belgium
The La Ferté-sous-Jouarre memorial (also known as the Memorial to the Missing of the Marne), La Ferté-sous-Jouarre, France
The Ramleh Commonwealth War Graves Commission Cemetery (fully the Ramleh Commonwealth War Graves Commission Cemetery and Memorial to the Missing), near Ramla, Israel

See also
List of Commonwealth War Graves Commission World War I memorials to the missing in Belgium and France
Memorials to the Missing, BBC radio play